XECSCGU-AM is a community radio station on 1620 AM in Guachochi, Chihuahua, Mexico. The station is owned by the civil association Centro de Rehabilitación El Olivo, A.C., and is known as Creo Radio, airing Christian programming.

XECSCGU-AM is the first Mexican station on 1620 kHz.

History
The concession for XECSCGU-AM was awarded March 20, 2019.

References

2020 establishments in Mexico
Christian radio stations in Mexico
Community radio stations in Mexico
Radio stations established in 2020
Radio stations in Chihuahua
Spanish-language radio stations